Okanagana mariposa is a species of cicada in the family Cicadidae. It is found in North America.

Subspecies
These two subspecies belong to the species Okanagana mariposa:
 Okanagana mariposa mariposa Davis, 1915
 Okanagana mariposa oregonensis Davis, 1939

References

Further reading

 
 

Articles created by Qbugbot
Insects described in 1915
Okanagana